William James Herbert Hayens (1861 – January 22, 1944) was an English novelist and editor. He was well known for his juvenile fiction and books written for schools.

Biography
Hayens was born in 1861 and lived most of his life in Glasgow, Scotland. In 1933, he married Jeanie Douglas. He worked at Collins & Co. as chief editor. He edited anthologies and was an author of many books written for boys and young adults. Several of his books focused on themes of war and adventure and was compared in style to George Alfred Henty. One reviewer said that Hayens chose settings in out-of-the-way places. His book, A Vanished Nation is an account of the Paraguayan War; A Captain of the Irregulars chronicled the war between Chile and Peru; and Red, White and Green told a story about the Hungarian Revolution of 1848. However, the reviewer criticised Hayens for paying more attention to the subject matter which detracted from the literary cohesion of his novels.

He was once described as, "...of Devonshire seafaring stock, and with his blue eyes, flowing moustache and greying hair looked more like an old-time Devonshire sea captain than an editor".

Works
Hayens published both fiction and non-fiction. Almost all his books were targeted towards young boys and teenagers. His non-fiction books were used in schools.

 Under the Lone Star: A Story of Revolution in Nicaragua, fiction, 1896
 Paris at Bay: A Story of the Siege, fiction, 1897
 Clevely Sahib: A Tale of the Khyber Pass, fiction, 1897
 Soldiers of the Legion: A Tale of the Carlist War, fiction, 1898
 An Emperor's Doom; or The Patriots of Mexico, fiction, 1898
 In the Grip of the Spaniard, fiction, 1899
 A Fighter in Green: A Tale of Algeria, fiction, 1899
 A Captain of Irregulars, fiction, 1900
 A Vanished Nation, fiction, 1900
 One of the Red Shirts: A Story of Garibaldi's Men, fiction, 1901
 The Red, White, and Green, fiction, 1901
 Ye Mariners of England: A Boy's Book of the Navy, non-fiction, 1901
 For the Colours: A Boy's Book of the Army, non-fiction, 1902
 Scouting for Buller, fiction, 1902
 A Mystery of the Sea, fiction, 1903
 Jack Fraser's Adventures, fiction, 1903
 At the Point of the Sword: A Story for Boys, fiction, 1903
 The President's Scouts: A Story of the Chilian Revolution, fiction, 1904
 The Prince Edward Readers, edited, 1904
 My Sword's My Fortune: A Story of Old France, fiction, 1904
 Two Old Sea-Dogs: Drake and Blake, fiction, 1904
 The Gayton Scholarship: A School Story, fiction, 1904
 With Sword and Ship, fiction, 1906
 The Story of Europe, non-fiction, 1907
 Stirring and True, non-fiction, 1907
 Famous Fights, non-fiction, 1907
 For the Colours, non-fiction, 1908
 Ye Mariners of England, non-fiction, 1908
 The Bravest Gentleman in France:...In the Days of Louis XIII, fiction, 1908
 The Red Caps of Lyons: A Story of the French Revolution, fiction, 1909
 The Making of the Homeland, non-fiction, 1909
 The British Legion: A Tale of the Carlist War, fiction, 1910
 For Rupert and the King, fiction, 1910
 Beset by Savages, fiction, 1910
 An Amazing Conspiracy, fiction, 1914
 Teuton Versus Slav: The Peoples of the War, non-fiction, 1914
 The Forward Adventure Book, edited, 1916
 Britain's Glory on Land and Sea, non-fiction, 1916
 'Midst Shot and Shell in Flanders, fiction, 1916
 The Victory Adventure Book, edited, 1916
 From Anzac to Buckingham Palace: A Tale of the V.C., fiction, 1917
 The Triumph Adventure Book, edited, 1917
 Lords of the Air, non-fiction, 1918
 The Dreadnought Adventure Book, edited, 1918
 Wanderings in Wonderland, edited, 1918
 Bunty's Best Book, edited, 1918
 Our Island Heroes, edited, non-fiction, 1918
 The 'Play Up' Series, non-fiction, 1919
 The Mystery of the Amazon, non-fiction, 1919
 A Kidnapped Prince, fiction, 1919
 Under Haig and Foch, non-fiction, 1919
 The Imperial Adventure Book, edited, 1919
 The Gayton Scholarship, fiction, 1920
 The Sultan's Emerald, fiction, 1920
 Young Hearts, short stories, 1920
 The Standard Adventure Book, edited, 1920
 The Garden of Literature, edited, 1920
 Golden Spurs, edited, 1920
 Bunty's Bonny Book, edited, 1922
 The Pelt and Rifle Adventure Book, edited, 1922
 Children of Other Times, non-fiction, 1922
 Bunty's Story Book, edited, 1922
 The Camp-Fire Adventure Book, edited, 1922
 The Honour of a Royall, fiction, 1923
 A Little Book of Historical Fiction, edited, short stories, 1924
 A Little Book of Historical Poetry, edited, poetry, 1924
 A Book of Verse, edited, poetry, 1924
 In the Days of the Knights, non-fiction, 1924
 Selected English Letters, edited, biography, 1924
 Poems and Ballads, edited, poetry, 1924
 New World School Series, edited, 1924
 Selected English Essays, edited, 1925
 Readings from the Naturalists, edited, 1925
 Play Up, Buffs!, school stories, 1926
 Play Up, Blues!, school stories, 1926
 Play Up, Kings!, school stories, 1926
 Play Up, Queens!, school stories, 1927
 Play Up, Swifts!, school stories, 1927
 Play Up, Royals!, school stories
 Play Up, Magpies!, school stories
 Play Up, Greys!, school stories
 Play Up! Omnibus for Boys, short stories, 1928
 The Secret of the Vault, short stories, 1929
 Aces of the Air, non-fiction, 1930
 The Mascot, short stories, 1930
 The Heart-Shaped Ruby, fiction, 1930
 Jack, The Merrymaker, fiction, 1930
 The Priory Mystery, fiction, 1931
 Pirates and Adventurers, non-fiction, 1931
 The Captain of Queens, fiction, 1932
 Happy Days at Cheverill, fiction, 1932
 A History of English Literature for Schools, non-fiction, 1932
 The Treasure Hunt, fiction, 1932
 The New Captain, school story, fiction, 1932
 The Outlaw's Stronghold, fiction, 1933

References

External links
 
 

1861 births
1944 deaths
English historical novelists
Writers from Glasgow
Writers of historical fiction set in the modern age